Nonavinakere is located in Tumkur District of Karnataka. It is around 64 km south-west of Tumkur and 12 km west of Turuvekere. Its Pincode is 572224.

Tiptur Railway Station and Banasandra Railway Station are the nearest railheads. Bangalore International Airport is the nearest airport.

In Nonavinakere there are two famous temples one is Betarya swamy and Venugopala swamy out of which Gopala Krishna swamy temple was built during the Chalukya dynasty. A car festival for the temples is held during March–April.

In some seasons, the pond overflows through the surrounding countryside.
the pond will be very good to see when it overflows.

Nonvinkere there is another famous temple kadasiddeshwaramath its related to someshwara god.

Villages in Tumkur district